The Royal Automobile Club of Australia (RACA) is an Australian motoring organisation, which has also incorporated the Australian Imperial Services Club since 1987.

The RACA was established in March 1903 in Sydney, and is the oldest motoring club in Australia, 
founded by Henry Alfred ‘Harrie’ Skinner, WE Fisher and HE Jones.
The Royal Automobile Club of Australia had an important role in shaping early motoring legislation, in safeguarding the rights of motorists, and in establishing motorsport in Australia.

The organisation used to provide roadside service and insurance but in 1945 in an agreement with the 
NRMA ceased offering these services with members gaining reciprocal access to NRMA provided services.

The RACA is a member of the Australian Automobile Association.

History

Original Office Bearers 
The first Office Bearers of the Royal Automobile Club of Australia (RACA), in 1903, were:

President: HA Jones
First Vice President: James Macken
Second Vie President: Dr C McCarthy
Third Vice President: Harrie Skinner
Fourth Vice President: Harry Vale
Hon Treasurer:	George Lane
Hon Secretary:	WE Fisher
Consulting Engineer: AJ Knowles
General Committee:
AA Hunter
W Reid
G Hamilton
R Empson
J Gibbs
RS Gillett
Original or Founder Members:
CA Berry
JS Brunton
C Bennett
Dr P Cooley
R Empson
WE Fisher
Mark Foy
J Gibbs
R Gillett
Dr F Hall
G Hamilton
Dr H C Hinder
AA Hunter
HA Jones
WH Kelly
AJ Knowles
OG Lane
Dr CW McCarthy
James Macken
RJC Maddrell
AR Marks
HF Maddrell
J Spencer Nolan
I Phizackerle
Dr Rowland Pope
W Reid
H Skinner
EP Simpson
AE Starkey
E Tyson
H Vale

Past Presidents
 HA Jones (1903-1908)
 S Horden Sr. (1908-1909)
 GF Todman (1909-1910)
 Sir Samuel Hordern, KBE (1910-1912, 1914-1930)
 Colonel JM Arnott (1912-1914)
 PA Oatley (1930-1936)
 WJ Bradley QC BA LLB (1936-1937)
 Sir John Butters, KB CMG MBE VD (1937-1949)
 H Scougall (1949-1956)
 HA Fisher-Webster BA (Oxon) (1956-1967)
 GW Cutts (1967-1970)
 AF Bode FCA (1970-1973)
 JO Sherwood MBE (1973-1982)
 BV Clifton (1982-1987)
 RG Wagland (1987-1992)
 BD Kelly (1992-1997)
 HE Nicholls (1997-1998)
 BJ Fisher (1998-2003)
 G. Thomas (2003-2016)
 M. Callanan (2016-2021)
 M. Lavender (2021-2022)
 S. Hathway (2022-

See also

Motorsport in Australia

References

External links
Homepage of the RACA

Automobile Club of Australia, Royal
Automobile associations in Australia
Motorsport governing bodies in Australia
Clubs and societies in Australia
1903 establishments in Australia
Organizations established in 1903
Organisations based in Sydney
Gentlemen's clubs in Australia
Buildings and structures in Sydney